George Lang may refer to:
 George C. Lang (1947–2005), United States Army soldier and Medal of Honor recipient
 George Dunmore Lang (1832–1875), Australian politician
 George H. Lang (1874–1958), British Bible teacher and writer
 George Lang (cinematographer), American cinematographer
 George Lang (restaurateur) (1924–2011), Hungarian-American restaurateur
 George Lang (builder) (1821–1881), Nova Scotian mason and builder
 George Lang (Ohio politician), member of the Ohio House of Representatives